Daniel Steven Kimbugwe Kajumba (born 20 November 1952, Uganda) is an Anglican priest. Since 2001, he has been the Archdeacon of Reigate.
 
Kajumba was educated at school in Uganda and also has a degree from the Open University; and was ordained after earlier jobs in the caring professions in 1986. After a curacy in Goldington he worked in his home country until 1998. He was then team vicar of Horley until his archdeacon's appointment. He was appointed as a member of the board of governors of Monkton Combe School in 2004.

Kajumba's retirement was announced as 23 February 2016.

References

1952 births
Ugandan Anglican priests
Archdeacons of Reigate
Governors of Monkton Combe School
Living people